Enid Woodring Regional Airport  is a city-owned, public-use airport located four nautical miles (5 mi, 7 km) southeast of the central business district of Enid, a city in Garfield County, Oklahoma, United States.  It is also referred to as Woodring Airport and was formerly known as Enid Woodring Municipal Airport. This airport is included in the National Plan of Integrated Airport Systems for 2011–2015, which categorized it as a general aviation facility. It is mostly used for military training flights based at Vance Air Force Base.

Scheduled passenger flights on Great Lakes Airlines to Denver and Liberal were discontinued in August 2006. The service was subsidized by the Essential Air Service program. From the early 1950s well into the 1960s, the airport was served by Central Airlines.

A new terminal building was built in 2019 and now contains the FBO service area, a Flight Planning Room, a Pilot Lounge, and conference room. There is also a restaurant in the terminal building. Outdoors is the Woodring Wall of Honor and Veterans Park, which honors Oklahoma veterans. Ceremonies are held annually on Memorial Day to honor fallen soldiers. A veterans museum at the site is open Thursdays through Saturdays.

History 
Enid was the first city of Oklahoma to have a municipally owned airport. The airport was dedicated in 1928, and built on 80 acres of land donated by a citizen backed by the American Legion, and Enid passed a $50,000 bond, making it the first city in Oklahoma to use bonds to fund an airport.

I. A. Woodring 
Enid's Airport was renamed Enid Woodring Municipal Airport on May 30, 1933, after Lieutenant Irvin A. (Bert) Woodring, born February 1, 1902, in Enid, Oklahoma. Irvin A. Woodring was one of the U.S. Army Air Corps' "Three Musketeers of Aviation" along with fellow pilots John J. Williams and William Lewers Cornelius. The group performed aerobatics at the National Air Races. J.J. Williams died in practice at Mines Field, Los Angeles on September 11, 1928.  Charles Lindbergh, for whom the three had served as escorts, filled in following Williams death. Two weeks later, W. L. Cornelius died when his plane collided with another plane. On January 20, 1933, Bert Woodring fell 2,000 feet to his death over Wright Field in Dayton, Ohio, when his Consolidated P-30 fighter exploded in mid-air.

Historical airline service
Enid Woodring Regional Airport was served by commercial airlines from 1949 through 2006 with flights to Dallas, Denver, Kansas City, Oklahoma City, Tulsa, and Wichita. Central Airlines was the first carrier beginning in 1949. In 1967 Central merged with Frontier Airlines (1950-1986) which continued service until 1979. Several commuter airlines then served Enid which included: Air Midwest (1979-1981), Metro Airlines (1981-1986), Lone Star Airlines (1986-1998), Midcontinent Airlines dba as Braniff Express (1989), feeder carrier for Braniff (1983-1990), Big Sky Airlines (1999-2002), Mesa Airlines (2002-2005), and Great Lakes Airlines (2005-2006).

Facilities and aircraft 
Enid Woodring Regional Airport covers an area of 1,206 acres (488 ha) at an elevation of 1,167 feet (356 m) above mean sea level. It has two runways: 17/35 is 8,613 by 100 feet (2625 x 30 m) with a concrete surface; 13/31 is 3,150 by 108 feet (960 x 33 m) with an asphalt surface.

For the 12-month period ending September 30, 2011, the airport had 36,000 aircraft operations, an average of 98 per day:53% military, 46% general aviation, and 2% air taxi. At that time there were 73 aircraft based at this airport: 85% single-engine, 8% multi-engine, and 7% jet.

Gallery

References 

 Essential Air Service documents (Docket OST-1997-2401) from the U.S. Department of Transportation:
 Order 2002-7-2 (July 5, 2002): selecting Air Midwest, Inc., to provide essential air service at seven communities (El Dorado/Camden, AR; Jonesboro, AR; Harrison, AR; Hot Springs, AR; Enid, OK; Ponca City, OK; Brownwood, TX) for a two-year period at subsidy rates totaling $6,693,881 annually.
 Order 2004-6-12 (June 17, 2004): requests interested persons to show cause why it should not terminate the essential air service subsidy eligibility of Jonesboro, Arkansas, Enid and Ponca City, Oklahoma, and Brownwood, Texas, and allow Air Midwest to suspend its subsidized services at those communities as of October 1, 2004, when the current rate term expires.
 Order 2005-1-14 (January 25, 2004): selecting Air Midwest, Inc., to provide essential air service at El Dorado/Camden, Jonesboro, Harrison and Hot Springs, Arkansas, at a subsidy rate of $4,155,550 annually for a two-year rate term, selecting Great Lakes Aviation, Ltd., to provide essential air service at Enid and Ponca City, Oklahoma at a subsidy rate of $1,272,557 annually for allowing Air Midwest to discontinue its service there, if it chooses to do so.
 Order 2006-7-25 (August 1, 2006): terminating the essential air service subsidy eligibility of Enid and Ponca City, Oklahoma, and allowing Great Lakes Aviation, Ltd., to suspend service at the two communities as of September 1, 2006, if it chooses.

External links 
 Enid Woodring Airport at City of Enid website
 Aerial photo as of February 1995 from USGS The National Map
 
 
 
 Woodring Wall of Honor and Veterans Park official website

Airports in Oklahoma
Enid, Oklahoma
Buildings and structures in Garfield County, Oklahoma
Former Essential Air Service airports